The 2022 Nürburgring Langstrecken Series is the 45th season of the German endurance series (formerly VLN) run at the Nürburgring Nordschleife, and third run as the Nürburgring Langstrecken Serie (NLS). The season began on 26 March and will end on 22 October.

Calendar

Classes 
Entries are split into multiple different classes. Current classes are:

Entry Lists

SP9

SPX